2,3-Methylenedioxymethamphetamine (2,3-MDMA) is a positional isomer of the recreational drug 3,4-MDMA (commonly known as Ecstasy or Molly).

See also 
 2,3-Methylenedioxyamphetamine (2,3-MDA)

References 

Methamphetamines
Benzodioxoles